Arrillaga Musical College was a music college in San Francisco. The school was established  and directed by pianist Santiago Arrillaga Ansola, a Basque immigrant. After his death it was run by his son Vincent. Fernando Michelena (1858–1921), a Venezuelan born tenor and the father of Vera Michelena and Beatriz Michelena, also served as its president. It was located at 2315 Jackson Street.

Arrillaga came to San Francisco in 1875. San Francisco developed a significant Basque presence with hotels and musical venues.

Alumni included Howard E. Couper A.M.

The Musical Courier reported on performances at the 1918 commencement. A separate writeup in the same issue described the school as having its own building, an "imposing faculty", and many pupils.

References

Music schools in San Francisco
Universities and colleges in San Francisco
Educational institutions in the United States with year of establishment missing
Year of disestablishment missing
Defunct private universities and colleges in California